is a Japanese professional shogi player ranked 6-dan.

Promotion history
The promotion history for Nagaoka is as follows:

 6-kyū: 1997
 1-dan: 2001
 4-dan: April 1, 2005
 5-dan: November 2, 2010
 6-dan: December 10, 2020

References

External links
ShogiHub: Professional Player Info · Nagaoka, Yuya

1985 births
Japanese shogi players
Living people
People from Hachiōji, Tokyo
Professional shogi players
Professional shogi players from Tokyo Metropolis